Adenostoma sparsifolium, commonly known as redshanks or less commonly, ribbonwood or ribbon bush, is a multi-trunked tree or shrub native to dry slopes or chaparral of Southern California and northern Baja California.

Description
Shaggy falling shanks or ribbons of bark are one of the strongest characteristics of the Adenostoma sparsifolium tree, hence the common names. As the species name "sparsifolium" suggests, it has tiny, filamentous leaves. Redshanks are closely related to the more abundant Chamise (Adenostoma fasciculatum).

Ecology
Redshanks inhabits higher elevations of chaparral just above and below the snowline in the Peninsular Ranges and does best on north-facing "ubac" slopes at around 4,000 feet of elevation. Associates at its lower range include California Scrub Oak and Hoary Ceanothus, and mingles with manzanitas at its upper range.

Like its relative, chamise, it is capable of resprouting after a fire.

References

External links

Jepson Manual Treatment — Adenostoma sparsifolium
Adenostoma sparsifolium Ecology
Adenostoma sparsifolium Photo gallery

sparsifolium
Flora of Baja California
Flora of California
Natural history of the California chaparral and woodlands
Natural history of the California Coast Ranges
Natural history of the Peninsular Ranges
Natural history of the Santa Monica Mountains
Natural history of the Transverse Ranges